Jeffrey Matthew Settle (born September 17, 1969) is an American actor. He is known for playing Captain Ronald Speirs on the HBO miniseries Band of Brothers and Rufus Humphrey on the CW teen drama series Gossip Girl.

Early life
Settle was born in Hickory, North Carolina, the son of Joan and Robert Settle, a Baptist minister. He is the youngest of six children, having two sisters and three brothers.

Career
Settle made his Broadway debut in a strictly limited engagement in Chicago: The Musical, appearing as Billy Flynn from April 19 through June 13, 2010. He made his feature film debut in I Still Know What You Did Last Summer co-starring alongside Jennifer Love Hewitt, Freddie Prinze Jr., Mekhi Phifer, and Brandy Norwood. He also had a guest appearance in the seventh season of Law & Order: Special Victims Unit as a reporter in the episode "Storm". From 2007 to 2012, Settle portrayed Rufus Humphrey, the father of Dan and Jenny, on the CW teen drama series Gossip Girl. Other past roles include his portrayal of Capt. Ronald Speirs in the HBO miniseries Band of Brothers and his role as Jacob Wheeler in the TNT miniseries Into the West. He also played the part of John in the film Beneath. He played John in the 2006 movie, The Celestine Prophecy.

Personal life
In 2007, Settle revealed that in 2006, at age 37, he had eloped to marry actress and model Naama Nativ, with whom he had a child, born in 2009. The couple divorced in May 2011.

Filmography

Film

Television

References

External links

 
 

1969 births
20th-century American male actors
21st-century American male actors
American male film actors
American male television actors
Living people
Male actors from North Carolina
People from Hickory, North Carolina